XHYAT-FM is a community radio station on 94.1 FM in Ciudad Ixtepec, Oaxaca. It is known as Oaxaca Radio and owned by the civil association Yati Ne Casti, A.C.

History
Yati Ne Casti applied for a new community radio station on November 30, 2015. The Federal Telecommunications Institute approved the application on November 15, 2017.

References

Radio stations in Oaxaca
Community radio stations in Mexico
Radio stations established in 2019